The mixed doubles tournament at the 1990 French Open was held from 28 May until 10 June 1990 on the outdoor clay courts at the Stade Roland Garros in Paris, France. Jorge Lozano and Arantxa Sánchez Vicario won the title, defeating Danie Visser and Nicole Provis in the final.

Seeds

Draw

Finals

Top half

Section 1

Section 2

Bottom half

Section 3

Section 4

External links
1990 French Open – Doubles draws and results at the International Tennis Federation

Mixed Doubles
French Open by year – Mixed doubles